Andrew Letherby (born 19 September 1973) is an Australian former long-distance runner who won a bronze medal in the marathon at the 2002 Commonwealth Games.

Biography

Early life
Letherby, originally from Adelaide, later lived in Queensland, before taking up an athletics scholarship at Georgia State University in 1994. He graduated with a Bachelor of Science degree and in 2001 married an American, Meg, with whom he moved to Boulder, Colorado, where he remained based during his athletics career.

Career
At the 2002 Commonwealth Games in Manchester, Letherby finished in third position, behind Francis Naali and Joshua Chelanga. He won a sprint finish for the bronze medal against one of the pre-race favourites, Kenya's Erick Wainaina.

Other notable performances in the marathon over the next two years includes a 35th placing at the 2003 World Championships and finishing eighth at both the 2004 and 2005 Boston Marathons.

His personal best in the marathon was set at the 2005 Berlin Marathon, when he finished in eight position with a time of 2:11:42.

In 2006 he was the national champion in the 10,000 metres and came fifth in the marathon at the 2006 Commonwealth Games.

He was 30th in the marathon event at the 2009 World Championships.

References

External links
Andrew Letherby at All-athletics.com

1973 births
Living people
Australian male long-distance runners
Australian male marathon runners
Commonwealth Games bronze medallists for Australia
Commonwealth Games medallists in athletics
Athletes (track and field) at the 2002 Commonwealth Games
Athletes (track and field) at the 2006 Commonwealth Games
World Athletics Championships athletes for Australia
Georgia State Panthers men's cross country runners
Georgia State Panthers men's track and field athletes
Athletes from Adelaide
Sportsmen from Queensland
Sportspeople from Boulder, Colorado
Australian expatriate sportspeople in the United States
Medallists at the 2002 Commonwealth Games